

Plants

Ferns and fern allies

Cycadophytes

Ginkgophytes

Conifers

Cupressaceae

Flowering plants

Magnoliids

Monocots

Basal Eudicots and unplaced core Eudicots

Superasterids

Superrosids

Other flowering plants

Arthropods

Insects

Archosauromorphs

Dinosaurs
Data courtesy of George Olshevsky's dinosaur genera list.

Pterosaurs

Synapsids

Non-mammalian

References

1930s in paleontology
Paleontology 6